The Belle of Bar-Z Ranch is a 1912 American silent short Western comedy film directed by Thomas Ricketts starring Harry Van Meter and Vivian Rich.

External links
 

1912 films
1910s Western (genre) comedy films
1912 comedy films
1912 short films
American black-and-white films
American silent short films
American comedy short films
Silent American Western (genre) comedy films
1910s American films
1910s English-language films